Trent Baker (14 June 1990 – 13 March 2016) was a pitcher and outfielder for the Brisbane Bandits organisation.

Career
Baker was signed as an outfielder by the Cleveland Indians in 2007 through MLBAAP. In Australia he debuted for the Queensland Rams in the 2008 Claxton Shield as a 17-year-old. He spent 2009 and 2010 with the Cleveland organisation, playing with five different teams from rookie league to AA. He totalled a .200 average over 111 at bats. Baker led the 2009 AZL Rookie League in outfield assists with 14, was 7th in the league in hits, 10th in the league in stolen bases. Baker was promoted to the Midwest A-League in his first professional season at the age of 19.

He was called up to the Brisbane Bandits active roster on 30 December 2010, when he debuted in centerfield against the Melbourne Aces, going 2–5. He finished the 2010–11 Australian Baseball League season batting .200, identical to his minor league batting average.
He was released by the Indians after 2010 spring training.

Trent was resigned as a pitcher in July by the Braves. He pitched his first professional game for the Bandits on 5 November 2011, allowing 3 runs over 3.2 innings in relief.

References

1990 births
2016 deaths
Akron Aeros players
Arizona League Indians players
Australian expatriate baseball players in the United States
Baseball outfielders
Baseball pitchers
Baseball players from Brisbane
Brisbane Bandits players
Kinston Indians players
Lake County Captains players
Mahoning Valley Scrappers players